Dinkins is a ghost town in Brazos County, in the U.S. state of Texas. It is located within the Bryan-College Station metropolitan area.

History
Dinkins was settled in the 1850s but was a part of Stephen F. Austin's first colony. It became a railroad stop on the International-Great Northern Railroad when it was built through Brazos County in the early 1900s. A post office was established at Dinkins in 1913 and remained in operation until 1931. G.W. Dunlap was the postmaster and owned a general store. He wanted to name the community after him, but it was mistakenly referred to as Dinkins. Its population was 25 in 1915 and remained at that level until the train stopped running in the late 1940s. The stop continued to operate, and Dinkins had a store as well. The tracks were eventually removed in 1965-66. It was empty farmland by the 1990s.

Geography

Education
In the late 1940s, Dinkins had a school that joined the schools in Millican and Allenfarm. Today, Dinkins is located within the Navasota Independent School District.

References

Ghost towns in Texas